"Kriminaltango" (Criminal tango) is a traditional pop song released in 1959. The Italian original by Piero Trombetta only achieved a modest success, whereas the German version performed by Hazy Osterwald became a big hit in Germany, Austria and Switzerland.

Describing scenes from tavern, the song juxtaposes the appearance of shady figures ("dunkle Gestalten") and their mysterious dealings with dancing tango ("Und sie tanzen einen Tango"). The song culminates with a shot in the dark and the arrival of the police, unable to assemble any evidence.

The song was covered by Die Toten Hosen, featuring Kurt Raab, in a non-album single in 1984.

It was also covered by The Deadfly Ensemble, appearing as a bonus track on their album "An Entire Wardrobe of Doubt and Uncertainty".

Die Toten Hosen cover

Track listing
 "Kriminaltango" (Trombetta/Feltz) − 3:32
 "Allein vor deinem Haus" (Alone in front of your house) (von Holst, Frege/Frege, Meurer, Trimpop) − 2:26
 "Es ist vorbei...." (It's over....) (Frege, von Holst/Frege, Meurer, Trimpop) − 3:09

References
Eskapaden um den Kriminaltango - article about on the song at SWR (German, retrieved 2010-4-2)

1984 singles
1959 songs
Die Toten Hosen songs
Songs with lyrics by Kurt Feltz